Tommy Genesis is the eponymous debut studio album by Canadian rapper Tommy Genesis. It was released on November 9, 2018, by Downtown Records.

Background
The album's release was preceded by the single "Tommy" in September 2017. Genesis describes the album as a "weird mesh of rapping and singing".

Reception
Prior to the album release, Genesis was featured in TheGuardian.com as "One to watch". Pitchfork rated the album 7.3. Highsnobiety rated the album 4.5 out of 5 stars.

Track listing
Credits adapted from Tidal.

References

External links 
Official website

2018 debut albums
Downtown Records albums
Tommy Genesis albums